Manuel de Jesús Cañadas (born 12 November 1947) is a retired footballer from El Salvador.

Club career
Cañadas has played the majority of his career at Atlético Marte, but also had spells at Alianza and Luis Ángel Firpo as well as in Guatemala with Antigua GFC.

International career
Cañadas has played for El Salvador from 1968 through 1976 but missed out on the 1970 FIFA World Cup squad due to injury.

External links
 ¿Qué pasó con... Manuel Cañadas ?Su perfil y triunfos (Profile) - ElSalvador.com

1947 births
Living people
People from San Miguel, El Salvador
Salvadoran footballers
El Salvador international footballers
C.D. Atlético Marte footballers
Alianza F.C. footballers
C.D. Luis Ángel Firpo footballers
Expatriate footballers in Guatemala
Antigua GFC players

Association football midfielders